Malygin is a Russian masculine surname that may refer to
Malygin (surname)
Malygina Strait or Malygin Strait in Siberia, Russia
 Malygin (1912 icebreaker), a Russian and later Soviet icebreaker launched in 1912 and lost in 1940.
 Malygin (1945 icebreaker), formerly the Finnish icebreaker Voima that was handed over to the Soviet Union was war reparations in 1945 and broken up in 1971.